This is a list of current ambassadors of Cambodia around the world.

List of ambassadors

See also 
 Lists of ambassadors

References

 
Cambodia